Stanford Leonard "Stan" Smith is a fictional character and the title character protagonist of the animated television series American Dad!. He is voiced by the series' co-creator and executive producer, Seth MacFarlane.

Stan is the patriarch of the Smith family. As the family's breadwinner, he works for the Central Intelligence Agency. Although he once held the position of a case officer at the CIA, he is also weapons expert for this agency. Stan often makes the mistake of applying the same extreme measures suited and used for his job in his personal life and with his family.

Stan is portrayed as drastic, endangering, rash, insensitive, inconsiderate, dog-eat-dog, racist, and very masculine. In the series he is emphasized as a conservative Republican. Stan has an exaggeratedly large chin, which has been described satirically as a "Jay Leno jaw". He usually wears a blue suit with a lapel pin that is a simplified version of the U.S. flag, consisting of three red and white stripes and a blue square.
Although he has all of these traits, he is shown to deeply care for his family (despite the different traits between them). He is shown to say that "you're right" to family members to show that he cares and listens to them. In the episode "I'm Dreaming of a White Porsche Christmas" he doesn't like his alternate universe family.

While Stan's exact age has been contradicted by multiple episodes, it is in the vicinity of around 42 years old. In "Bullocks to Stan", Stan is revealed to be two years and ten months older than Francine, whose birthday is revealed to be September 26, putting his birthday around November 26. This makes him a Sagittarius. Stan is married to Francine Smith. He is the father of Hayley and Steve Smith. In “The Kidney Stays In The Picture,” it is revealed that he may not be the biological father of Hayley, but it is confirmed at the end of the episode. In "Cock of the Sleepwalk", Stan adopted an unnamed little girl. Also living under Stan's roof are three housemates: Roger, an alien; Klaus, the family's man-in-a-fish-body pet; and Jeff Fischer, who is Hayley's boyfriend turned husband. Stan's mother is named Betty, and his father is a jewel thief (as revealed in the episode "Con Heir") named Jack Smith.

Personality
Stan Smith is the exaggeratedly masculine husband of Francine and father of Steve and Hayley. Though Hayley may not be Stan's biological daughter—Francine was revealed to have cheated on Stan at her bachelorette party in the episode "The Kidney Stays in the Picture"—Stan still regards her as such and refused to learn the results of a DNA test. As the Smith family's breadwinner, Stan is an agent for the CIA. Tending to take extreme measures with no regard for others nor potentially disastrous consequences, Stan is portrayed as insanely drastic; endangering; rash; dog-eat-dog; and both inconsiderate and insensitive of others. Stan's mentality is of a staunchly conservative Republican and self-proclaimed American patriot.  His conservatism is expressed ludicrously with him often coming off as severely intolerant, self-abnegating, and wrongheaded. All the same however, Stan has numerous alternate ways of taking drastic measures beyond politics. As examples—in the episode "Dope & Faith" when Stan found out one of his friends was an atheist, he tried getting him to pray by blowing up his home, spreading the bird flu at his restaurant, brainwashing his wife into thinking she was a lesbian, and taking his kids away; in the episode "I Can't Stan You", Stan evicted his entire neighborhood and his own family just for overhearing some of his neighbors gossiping about him behind his back; in the episode "Four Little Words", Stan framed his wife as a murderer all so as not to hear her say the words "I told you so"; etc.

Troublesome sides and extreme-measure taking
Insanely drastic and rashly so, Stan at times acts on his first impulses which  typically result in extreme measures. Often, his extreme measures are of a conspicuously destructive, disastrous, offensive, or life-threatening nature to others. Very selfish and inconsiderate, Stan never stops to think about the feelings, needs, or welfare of others, even in circumstances where others obviously could be or have been negatively impacted. Moreover, Stan often proves to be insensitive, completely unfazed when fully conscious of the distresses, displeasure and sufferings brought upon and felt by others including his very own family.

Masculinity
Stan is also shown to be very virile and masculine. He often bears out his chest, stands up rigidly straight, and possesses a deep, thick voice quality. Moreover, he has expressed macho beliefs. For example, he has expressed opposition to showing emotion, associating it with being a woman. He once told Steve, "Son, feelings are what women have. They come from their ovaries."

Troublesome/redeeming qualities
Though Stan typically tries to effect a masculine image and repress his feelings, his emotions, sensitivity, and endearing side still manifest themselves from time to time. For example, on several occasions, it has been revealed that even as an adult Stan has desperately desired the fatherly love and attention that he never got as a child, such as in the episode "American Stepdad" when Roger became his stepfather.

At the same time, however, his incredibly drastic, dog-eat-dog, and inconsiderate qualities tend to show through in combination with his sensitive and redeeming qualities. For example, Hayley once told Stan, "Dad, I've never seen this side of you. It's so sweet." Stan playfully replied, "Well, if you tell anybody I'll kill you." The two laughed together for a moment before Stan suddenly took a serious, browbeating manner and added, "I'm serious, I will kill you. I will reach into your chest, pull out your beating heart and eat it. All of it, every last bit!" He concluded by affectionately stating, "Well, sweet dreams, angel." As another example, in the episode "Oedipal Panties", Stan went to extremes to keep his mother, Betty, from finding a romantic partner for fear he would lose her. In the episode, Stan was revealed to have captured and detained all of Betty's former lovers to an uncharted island.

Original persona
In the beginning of the series, it was heavily emphasized that Stan was a highly Conservative Republican, bordering on right-wing authoritarianism. He idolized then United States President George W. Bush and former President Ronald Reagan.
Combined with these traits, he was also portrayed as patriotic and Christian. Stan regularly caused havoc and disorder with his bigotry, Conservatism, patriotism, chauvinism, xenophobia, and paranoia. MacFarlane has likened Stan's original character to Archie Bunker from All in the Family.

Under his initial persona, he also opposed homosexuality and gay marriage for a time. He changed his views on homosexuality, however, in the episode "Lincoln Lover", once becoming associated with the Log Cabin Republicans. Stan's stance on homosexuality further softened in the episode "Surro-Gate" when Francine acted as a surrogate mother for gay couple Greg and Terry's baby. At the end of this episode, Stan realized what a loving family Greg and Terry were.

After the first few seasons and as the series progressed, Stan was portrayed as growing out of these particular traits and they were largely dropped from his character. Branching out, he later began displaying his wrongheadedness and penchant for taking to extremes in numerous other ways beyond ultra right-wing politics. He has also exhibited instances of gullibility (like his son Steve) such as when he believed he was taking cold medicine when in fact he was smoking "crack" as Roger nonchalantly points out. Hayley has also tricked him into buying mirrored sunglasses that wound up getting him kidnapped by a group of radicals. In another episode, Roger states to Stan that he has to "give" his champion racehorse "a full release", which Stan ultimately does so. Stan has also once drunk Roger's urine due to the alien telling him it was a fancy beer. The episode "Irregarding Steve" reveals that Stan believes that popcorn doesn't pop above sea level. In "Love, AD Style" when Francine points out if they added another "C" before the "K" in the acronym of the new car Stan wants to buy he says he doesn't know what she's talking about, clearly not realizing what the new acronym would spell out. In "Stanny Tendergrass" Stan thought he was able to afford a membership at Mr. Vanderhill's (Roger's) country club after working there thirty years at the cost of seven grand, completely unaware of the vast price inflation cost (two hundred grand).

Occupation
Stan's history can be traced back to 1987 when he was 24. He joined the army and quickly rose to become an Airborne Ranger, and eventually being selected to join the army's elite anti-terrorist group, Delta Force. After leaving the army, he was again elected to undergo extensive special forces training to join the CIA's ultra-secretive Special Activities Division, specifically the Special Operations Group.

When he was wounded on a top-secret mission inside North Korea, Stan returned home to a desk job. Stan is now an official officer of the CIA. Stan has shown expertise and knowledge in hand-to-hand combat, small arms, covert surveillance methods, torture, the ability to fly aircraft and the handling of assault weapons. Even though he has been arrested several times on several felony charges, such as animal cruelty, child pornography (though this was a wrongful accusation), attempted murder, drug trafficking, possession and use of crack cocaine (he almost flees to South America), transporting infected cattle to be slaughtered for food, impersonating a U.S. Marshal, and identity theft, he retains his official position.

Though it is well known he works for the CIA, very little is actually known about what exactly he does; and, as a result of this ambiguity, Stan's job in any given episode tends to be conducive of whatever CIA skill set is convenient for a given episode's plot. At various times in the series, he has been shown to work as a CIA analyst, an agency bureaucrat, a field agent, and a special forces operative; additionally, he has held a number of different titles during his time with the CIA, including (but not limited to) "Deputy-Deputy Director of the CIA ("Bullocks to Stan")" and "Deputy Under-Director of Missing Foreign Agents" ("Red October Sky"). Usually he is seen working in a small cork-walled cubicle with a few of his buddies: Jackson, Sanders, Dick Reynolds, and others. Smith's assumption of these different roles may indicate that he works as a sort of troubleshooter, taking on different responsibilities as required. However, since assuming the role of Deputy Deputy Director, his duties do not appear to have changed.

In the episode "Chimdale", it is revealed that Stan Smith has been bald since college and wears a wig (however, this episode contradicts several past episodes, including "Frannie 911", in which Roger scalped Stan while role playing as an American Indian, and "Choosy Wives Choose Smith", in which Stan's hair grew after spending months on a deserted island). He drives a black Ford Explorer but has also been seen driving a black Chrysler 300C and owns a DeLorean despite not having seen or even knowing about the movie Back to the Future. Later in the series, he buys a red C6 Chevrolet Corvette to deal with the fact that he could possibly be a grandfather, which he continues to drive when not in the Explorer. Stan is also known to have an unexplained fear of seagulls, first mentioned by Francine in "American Dream Factory", although he got over it in "Choosy Wives Choose Smith".

Despite his traditional values, he has been married to two other women. In Saudi Arabia, Stan married an Arab woman and named her "Thundercat" because he could not pronounce her name, though Stan married her mainly as a servant. At one point, Francine divorced Stan so that he could have pointless sex, and he met and married a woman named Joanna, but went back to Francine, though Stan reports that he did consummate the marriage. Both Stan and Francine admit that each married the other for what Stan describes as selfish reasons. That is, that Stan admits that he married Francine because she was attractive. Francine, for her part, says that she wants someone to take care of her financially and both go so far as to admit this during their vow renewal ceremony to a room full of people. In the episode "Stan's Food Restaurant", it is revealed that Stan is originally from Philadelphia.

Hobbies
Stan also enjoys a number of hobbies. Chief among these is collecting Franklin Mint Plates as well as a number of creative outlets such as designing and making themed stuffed bears, fly-tying, gun cleaning, wood burning, figure skating, and writing right-wing children's literature. He also enjoys reading books about the things he is doing at that very moment (i.e. he was reading a book called "Reading While Waiting", as he waited for someone). Other examples include "How to Do a Spit Take", "How to Furrow Your Brow", "How to Look Chastened", "How to Read With One Hand", and "Anticipating Doorbells".

Alternate versions
In "May the Best Stan Win" Stan is revealed to have signed up for the CIA's cybernetics program and intends for his body to be cryogenically frozen until the CIA develops the technology needed to turn him into an cyborg. Eventually, Stan's cybernetically enhanced self finds a way to travel back 1,000 years to the present because he missed Francine and wishes to spend time with her, however this eventually sparks friction between the present Stan and the cyborg Stan, leading to a fight in which the current Stan successfully defeats his future self.

In "The Longest Distance Relationship" one possible version of the future is shown when Jeff and Ghost Sinbad emerge from a wormhole some sixty years in the future. In this version of the future Stan is shown to have migrated into a Gorilla body due to his belief that an ape uprising will occur. As the episode draws to a close Stan's prediction proves true, but when Stan moves to side with the apes he is unexpectedly killed by them.

In "Dreaming of a White Porsche Christmas" it is revealed that the reason that Stan's family is so dysfunctional is due to Stan's failure to appreciate what he has, which resulted in his marriage to Francine, his geeky son, his liberal daughter, and his adoption of a liberal version of Roger. Initially this was supposed to be a temporary setup, but the Angel assigned to Stan's case died, and it took his Christmas wish for the situation to resolve itself. Stan is then returned to what was supposed to be his ideal family: a conservative wife named Mary, an athletic son, a conservative and mild manner daughter named Ruth, and a version of Roger who does not partake in disguises, drinking, or drug use and holds a single legitimate job as an optometrist named Gerald. Despite being described as Stan's "ideal" family Stan rejects this version of his wife, his children, and Roger, and goes to great lengths to get back to his original, dysfunctional family, which he succeeds in doing.

In "A Star is Reborn" it is established that Stan is the reincarnation of a deceased movie star named Lenard. At the time Lenard was having an affair with Gloria Delmar, an alternate version of Francine. After the affair came to light both were killed by June Rosewood, Lenard's wife at the time. After rediscovering Lenard's reincarnation in Stan in the present, June welcomed Stan to her house and showed him the old movies he had made in his past life. When Stan rejects her for Francine, June once again attempts to kill them both, only to end up dying when Stan and Francine turn the tables on her.

Cameo appearances
 In the season 17 episode of The Simpsons (called "The Italian Bob"), Stan, along with Peter Griffin from Family Guy, can be glimpsed in an Italian sheriff's police book of criminal offenders. Peter Griffin is dubbed "Plagiarismo" (faux Italian for Plagiarism) and Stan is dubbed "Plagiarismo di Plagiarismo" (Plagiarism of Plagiarism).
 Stan appears alongside Avery Bullock in the Family Guy episode "Lois Kills Stewie" and Stewie Griffin mistakes Stan for Joe Swanson due to their large chins.
 Stan later appears again in Family Guy, this time in the episode "Bigfat" and Peter Griffin also mistakes him for Joe for the same reason.
 Stan makes a brief cameo in the Family Guy episode "Excellence in Broadcasting", commending Brian Griffin for becoming a conservative.
 A bobblehead of Stan can be seen in the Mad episode "Garfield of Dreams".

References

External links

 Stan Smith at Fox.com

American Dad! characters
Animated human characters
Fictional characters from Philadelphia
Television characters introduced in 2005
Animated characters introduced in 2005
Fictional cannibals
Fictional Central Intelligence Agency personnel
Fictional assassins
Fictional murderers
Fictional bullies
Fictional secret agents and spies
Fictional torturers and interrogators
Fictional Republicans (United States)
American male characters in television
Characters created by Seth MacFarlane
Male characters in animated series
Villains in animated television series
Male villains